Keith William Robert Lasley (born 21 September 1979) is a Scottish retired football midfielder, who is currently the Chief Operating Officer of Scottish Premiership club St Mirren. During his playing career, Lasley played for Motherwell, Plymouth Argyle and Blackpool.

Life and career
According to Daily Record article, Lasley was born in Paisley, Scotland. However, the official Motherwell site lists his birthplace as Glasgow. He joined Motherwell in 1999 from Paisley side Gleniffer Thistle, but had to wait 18 months to make his first team debut. He established himself in the team during the 2001–02 season and played regularly up until leaving the club in the summer of 2004 when he chose to not renew his contract. He scored nine goals in 97 appearances. Lasley joined Plymouth Argyle in June 2004, having signed a two-year contract with the club. He made 24 league appearances in the Championship during the 2004–05 campaign, but lost his place in the team the following season and was loaned out to Blackpool in February 2006. Having been released by Argyle later that year, Lasley spent time training with Kilmarnock before deciding to rejoin Motherwell. A cruciate ligament injury picked up in December sidelined him for the rest of the 2006–07 campaign.

He returned to make 32 league appearances the following season, scoring one goal, and signed a two-year contract extension in April 2008. Lasley made 48 league appearances over the next two seasons and then extended his contract by a further two years in April 2010. Having scored twice in October 2011, Lasley won the Scottish Premier League Player of the Month award after helping Motherwell win three of their four league matches that month.

On 25 May 2012, Lasley signed an extended two-year contract with Motherwell. He will also be the club captain from the start of the 2012–13 season. On 3 June 2014, Lasley signed another two-year contract with Motherwell. On 6 December 2014, he made his 400th appearance for Motherwell, in a 1–0 defeat against Celtic.

On 5 September 2015, Lasley was rewarded for his time at Motherwell with a testimonial match against Bolton Wanderers. He signed a new one-year deal with the club on 22 June 2016.

On 21 June 2017, Motherwell announced that Lasley had retired from the game and taken up the vacant Assistant Manager role at the club.

On 31 December 2020, Lasley was appointed Interim Manager of Motherwell following the resignation of Stephen Robinson.

On 15th April 2022, it was announced that Keith would join St Mirren as their Cheif Operating Officer, with him taking up the position on the 16th May 2022

On 12 September 2022, it was announced that Lasley was to be inducted into the Motherwell F.C. Hall of Fame.

Career statistics

References

External links
Keith Lasley profile at Motherwell F.C.

1979 births
Living people
Footballers from Glasgow
Scottish footballers
Association football midfielders
Motherwell F.C. players
Plymouth Argyle F.C. players
Blackpool F.C. players
Scottish Premier League players
English Football League players
Scottish Professional Football League players
Motherwell F.C. non-playing staff
Footballers from Paisley, Renfrewshire